Guernsey has competed thirteen times in the Commonwealth Games to date, beginning in 1970.

History
Guernsey first participated at the Games in 1970 in Edinburgh, Scotland.

Medals 

Medals won:
1982  10m Air Rifle – Men – Silver
 Fullbore Rifle Queens Prize (Pair) – Open – Bronze
1986  Lawn Bowls Pairs – Women – Silver
 Rapid Fire Pistol – Men – Silver
1990  Rapid Fire Pistol – Men – Gold
1994  25m Rapid Fire Pistol (Pair) – Men – Bronze
2022  Lawn Bowls Singles – Women – Silver
 400m Hurdles – Men – Bronze

References

 
Nations at the Commonwealth Games